Anne Cuneo (6 September 1936 – 11 February 2015) was a Swiss journalist, novelist, theatre and film director and screenwriter.

She was born in Paris of Italian parents, but studied in Lausanne. Her first novel came in 1967 and was called Gravé au diamant. In 1979 she received the lesser prize of the Schweizerische Schillerstiftung and by 1987 she worked for Télévision Suisse Romande.

Her career spanned four decades and fifteen novels, as well as dozens of plays and scripts for theatre, TV and radio. She died in 2015.

in 1995 Cuneo's novel Le trajet d’une rivière was awarded the prestigious Prix des Libraires, which celebrates the best novel published in the Francophone world each year.

Bibliography
 1967: Gravé au diamant, re-edition in 1968
 1969:  Mortelle maladie
 1970: La Vermine
 1972: Poussière du réveil,
 1975: Le Piano du pauvre,
 La vie de l'accordéoniste Denise Letourneur
 1976: La Machine Fantaisie,
 Une enquête sur le cinéma suisse
 1978: Passage des Panoramas,
 1979: Une cuillerée de bleu
 Anne parle de sa maladie, un cancer du sein
 1980: Les Portes du jour, Portrait de l'auteur en femme ordinaire vol1,
 1982: Les Portes du jour, Portrait de l'auteur en femme ordinaire vol2,
 1984: Hôtel Vénus
 1985: Le Monde des forains
 1987: Benno Besson et Hamlet,
 1989: Station Victoria
 1990: Prague aux doigts de feu
 1993: Trajet d'une rivière. 2015: Tregian's Ground (trans. Louise Rogers Lalaurie), And Other Stories, UK.
 1994: La flûte et les ratonneurs,
 1995: Au bas de mon rêve,
 1996: Objets de splendeur,
 Traite de la « dame Brune de Shakespeare»,
 1998: Âme de bronze
 Livre traitant du viol
 1999: D'or et d'oublis
 Livre traitant des avoir juifs en Suisse
 2000: Le sourire de Lisa
 Livre traitant de l'inceste
 2002: Le maître de Garamond,
 2004: Hôtel des cœurs brisés,
 ou le doping dans le cyclisme
 2005: Rencontres avec hamlet,
 2006: Les corbeaux sur nos plaines,
 2006: Lacunes de la mémoire,
 2007: Zaïda,
 2009: Conversation chez les Blancs, Anne-Marie Blanc comédienne
 2011: Un monde de mots, John Florio traducteur, lexicographe, pédagogue, homme de lettres
 2013: La Tempête des heures

Filmography
 1982: Cinéjournal au féminin
 1983: Signes de terre, signes de chair
 1986: Basta
 1992: Durchdringende Welten, le peintre Cenak Prajak
 1996: Die letzte Karte, Friedrich Glaser
 1996: Francis Tregian, Gentleman et Musicien 
 1998: D'or et d'oubli (script)
 2001: La Petite Gilberte, Anne-Marie Blanc comédienne
 2002: Ettore Cella, ein Künstlerleben
 2003: Ferdi 'national' Kübler
 2006: Opération Shakespeare à la Vallée de Joux

Awards
 1969: L'Anti-Prix de la Radio Suisse Romande
 1979: Schiller Award for her oeuvre
 1981: Prix culturel du Canton Zurich
 1990: Bibliomedia et Prix Alpes-Jura, for Station Victoria
 1994: Prix des Auditeurs de la Radio suisse romande
 1994: Prix de la Fondation vaudoise pour la Promotion artistique 
 1995: Prix des Libraires et Prix litteraire "Madame Europe" for Le Trajet d'une rivière
 2008 Anne Cuneo was awarded the title "Chevalier de l’Ordre des Arts et des Lettres de la République française" 
 2013 she was named "Commandeur de l’ordre National du Mérite".

References

External links

 
  Biography
  
  

1936 births
2015 deaths
French people of Italian descent
20th-century French novelists
21st-century French novelists
French women screenwriters
French screenwriters
French journalists
French film directors
Writers from Paris
Swiss people of Italian descent
Swiss women journalists
Swiss women novelists
Swiss screenwriters
French women film directors
Swiss women film directors
Place of death missing
French women novelists
20th-century Swiss novelists
21st-century Swiss novelists
21st-century Swiss women writers
Prix des libraires winners
21st-century French women writers
21st-century Swiss journalists
20th-century Swiss journalists
20th-century French women writers